An election for the Borough Council in Slough, England, was held on 6 May 2010. This was the 124th Slough general local authority election (including both whole council elections and elections by thirds) since Slough became a local government unit in 1863.

The regular 2010 election was to fill thirteen seats, one from each ward except Colnbrook with Poyle, for the 2010–2014 term. These thirteen seats were last contested in the Council election of 2006.

The remaining twenty-seven Slough Councillors will continue in office, for seats which will be next contested in 2011 or 2012.

Recent political history of Slough
Between 2004 and 2008, Slough council had no party in overall control. A coalition of the Britwellian, Independent, Liberal and Liberal Democrats Group (BILLD) and the Conservative Group formed a joint administration. In the 2008-2010 period the Labour Group had a majority and was in control of the council.

The BILLD Group is itself a local coalition, containing members from four parties or groups of independents. The organisations represented in the group, as at April 2010, were the Slough Liberal Democrats, the Slough Liberals, the Independent Britwellian Residents and Independents from Wexham Lea ward. The existing members of the Group have an electoral pact for the 2010 election, continuing electoral arrangements which started with the 2001 Slough Council election.

The Slough Party and a number of Independents, not affiliated with any of the three existing council groups, are also contesting the 2010 election.

At the time of the 2008 election there were twenty councillors each supporting the joint administration and the Labour opposition, with one vacancy. After the election count Labour secured four net gains, to give the party a 23:18 margin and a majority of five for the start of the 2008-2009 municipal year.

Shortly after the 2008 election, following some rapid defections and re-defections (see 2008 Slough Council election for additional details), a newly re-elected Labour Councillor (Pervez Choudhry who represents Central Ward) joined the Conservative Group. As a result, the Labour majority fell to three.

For the 2010-2011 municipal year, Councillor Choudhry was named as the Conservative group leader. The former Tory leader (Derek Cryer representing Langley St Mary's ward) left the Conservative council group, but remained a member of the Conservative Party.

Election result 2010
The plus/minus figure is the change in votes percentage from the 2008 Slough Council election.

Total valid votes: 49,166
Total spoilt votes: 509
Slough BC turnout:

New Council by group: Labour 24, BILLD 9 (Liberal Democrats 3, Independent 2, Independent Britwellian Residents 2, Liberal 2), Conservative 8. Total 41.

Labour majority: 7.

Summary of Election results by party from 2004

Note: The 2004 election was for the whole Council. Other elections are for a third of the Council. For them the overall totals, after the election, are given in brackets.

List of Councillors whose terms expired in 2010

 * Member of the Britwellian, Independent, Liberal and Liberal Democrats Group (BILLD)

Ward results
Candidates nominated for the 2010 election are named in this section, using the version of their name to be used on the ballot paper.

A candidate who was an incumbent Councillor for the ward being contested has an * following their name.

Figures for the total published electorate are given, at 1 March 2010. The number given is derived from the full register, not the edited register available to the general public. The spoilt votes and turnout figures were taken from the Slough Council website.

The change columns record alterations from the previous local election results.

Swing figures are only calculated when the same two parties shared the first two places in both the 2007 and 2008 elections. The swing given is two party or Butler swing, ignoring votes for other candidates. Swing is not calculated for Central Ward, for the same reasons why changes are not calculated. Contrary to the usual convention a positive swing figure is towards Labour and a negative swing towards Conservative (or other party as specified in the result).

Total eligible electorate for the Borough (including Colnbrook with Poyle): 88,967

Baylis and Stoke (2010: Labour hold)

Britwell (2010: Labour gain from Independent Britwellian Residents)
Paul Janik is a former Independent Britwellian Residents Councillor for this ward, serving from 2003 to 2006.

Central (2008-2012 term: Labour gain from Conservative; 2008-2011 term: Labour gain from vacant)
As two seats were filled at the 2008 election, the bloc vote electoral system was used. Each elector was entitled to cast up to two votes. The candidate with most votes was elected to the four-year term and the one in second place was returned for three years.

Councillor Pervez Choudhry was an incumbent councillor for the Chalvey ward, at the time of the election. A.S. Dhaliwal had represented the ward from 2000 until the 2004 Slough Council election.

Chalvey (2010: Labour gain from Conservative)

Cippenham Green (2010: Labour hold)

Cippenham Meadows (2010: Labour hold)

Colnbrook with Poyle (2008: Labour gain from Conservative)
This ward has no election in 2010. The total published electorate, at 1 March 2010, was 3,893.

Councillor Smith was, at the time of the 2008 election, the leader of the Conservative group on Slough Council.

Farnham (2010: Labour hold)
Councillor Anderson was the leader of the Labour group on Slough Council. Sumander Khan represented Central ward from 2004 to 2006.

Foxborough (2010: Liberal Democrats hold)

Haymill (2010: Conservative gain from Liberal)

Kedermister (2010: Labour hold)

Langley St Mary's (2010: Conservative hold)

Upton (2010: Labour gain from Conservative)

Wexham Lea (2010)

Members of Slough Borough Council May 2010

Notes:-
 * Member of the Britwellian, Independent, Liberal and Liberal Democrats Group (BILLD)
 (a) A.S. Dhaliwal: Formerly served 2000-2004
 (b) Parmar: Formerly served 1995-2000
 (c) Buchanan: Formerly served 2004-2006
 (d) Stokes: Formerly a Labour Councillor 1983-1986
 (f) Long: Formerly served 1983-1990
 (g) Dhillon: Formerly Conservative 2004 and Independent Conservative 2004–2007.
 (h) Bains: Formerly served 2003-2004
 (i) Haines: Formerly a Labour Councillor 1987-1991 and 1992–1998
 (k) Choudry: Defected from Labour to Conservative on 12 May 2008, after the election.
 (l) S.K. Dhaliwal, Rasib: Defected from Labour to Conservative on 13 May 2008, and re-defected back to Labour later the same day.

See also
 Slough
 Slough local elections
 Slough Borough Council
 Slough (UK Parliament constituency)

References
 The History of Slough, by Miss Maxwell Fraser (Slough Corporation 1973)
 A Short History of Slough, by Kathleen M. Jones (bound typescript volume in Slough Central Library)

External links
 Official results by ward 2004 Slough Borough Council website accessed 10 April 2010
 Official results by ward 2006 Slough Borough Council website accessed 10 April 2010
 Official results by ward 2007 Slough Borough Council website accessed 10 April 2010
 Official results by ward 2008 Slough Borough Council website accessed 10 April 2010
 Official Notice of Election 2010 Slough Borough Council website accessed 10 April 2010
 Link to official Statement of Persons Nominated 2010 and results by ward 2010 Slough Borough Council website accessed 7 May 2010
 Slough, UKPollingReport website accessed 10 April 2010

Notes

2010 English local elections
May 2010 events in the United Kingdom
2010
2010s in Berkshire